Eliran Hudeda (born 3 October 1981) is a former Israeli footballer who currently works as a manager at Ironi Tiberias.

He is of a Tunisian-Jewish descent.

Notes

1978 births
Living people
Israeli footballers
Maccabi Ironi Kiryat Ata F.C. players
Beitar Jerusalem F.C. players
Bnei Sakhnin F.C. players
Hapoel Haifa F.C. players
Maccabi Ahi Nazareth F.C. players
Hapoel Nof HaGalil F.C. players
Hapoel Hadera F.C. players
Hapoel Iksal F.C. players
Israeli Premier League players
Liga Leumit players
Footballers from Haifa
Israeli people of Tunisian-Jewish descent
Association football central defenders
Israeli football managers
Hapoel Iksal F.C. managers
Hapoel Ra'anana A.F.C. managers
Ironi Tiberias F.C. managers